Köln-Ehrenfeld is a railway station situated at Ehrenfeld, Cologne in western Germany on the Cologne–Aachen railway. It was opened with the first part of the line in 1839. It is served by Rhine-Ruhr S-Bahn and regional services. Not far from the station is the Venloer Straße/Gürtel underground station of the Cologne Stadtbahn.

Station
Köln-Ehrenfeld station has two platforms with four platform tracks, to the north of which there are two tracks without a platform for through passenger and freight trains. Tracks 1 and 2 are used for S-Bahn traffic, tracks 3 and 4 for regional traffic. Cologne-Ehrenfeld is a scheduled stop for all regional services passing through it. It is served by the S12 and S13 lines of the Rhine-Ruhr S-Bahn. Both lines operate towards Cologne at 20-minute intervals, so together they provide a 10-minute interval S-Bahn service to Cologne. It is also served by the S19 service between Düren and Au (Sieg), running hourly (substituting for an S13 service) on working days. It is also served by the NRW-Express (RE1), Rhein-Erft-Express (RE8), Rhein-Sieg-Express (RE9), Rhein-Erft-Bahn (RB27) and Erft-Bahn (RB38), all running hourly.

Venloer Straße/Gürtel station 

Within reach of a walking distance of some 100m, Ehrenfeld station is linked to Venloer Straße/Gürtel urban light rail station. This station offers connections on three Cologne Stadtbahn lines.

History
Köln-Ehrenfeld station was built with the construction of the first section of the Cologne–Aachen high-speed railway in 1839.

References

External links

KVB station diagram

S12 (Rhine-Ruhr S-Bahn)
Railway stations in Cologne
Rhine-Ruhr S-Bahn stations
S13 (Rhine-Ruhr S-Bahn)
Cologne-Bonn Stadtbahn stations
Cologne KVB stations
Railway stations in Germany opened in 1860

de:Köln-Ehrenfeld#Verkehr